Taeniaptera is a genus of stilt-legged flies in the family Micropezidae. There are at least 3 described species in Taeniaptera.

Species
Taeniaptera feei Steyskal, 1986 (palm grove stilt-legged fly)
Taeniaptera lasciva (Fabricius, 1798)
Taeniaptera trivittata Macquart, 1835

References

Further reading

External links

 Diptera.info
 NCBI Taxonomy Browser, Taeniaptera

Micropezidae
Nerioidea genera